Royal Jordanian Airlines (transliterated: Al-Malakiyyah al-'Urduniyyah), formerly known as Alia Royal Jordanian Airlines, is the flag carrier airline of Jordan with its head office in the capital, Amman. The airline operates scheduled international services over four continents from its main base at Queen Alia International Airport, with over 500 flights per week and at least 110 daily departures. It joined the Oneworld airline alliance in 2007.

History

1960s to 1990s 

The airline was established on 9 December 1963 and started operations on 15 December 1963 after a royal decree by the late King Hussein. It was named Alia (or Aalya) after King Hussein's eldest child, Princess Alia bint Al Hussein of Jordan (born on 13 February 1956). It is a common misconception that the airline was named after the King's third wife, Queen Alia, whom King Hussein did not marry until 1972. The airline was founded with capital from private shareholders but the Jordanian government later took over the company.

Alia (the Royal Jordanian Airline) started operations with two Handley Page Dart Heralds and a Douglas DC-7 aircraft, serving Kuwait City, Beirut and Cairo from Amman. In 1964, another DC-7 was added and service began to Jeddah. In 1965, Alia initiated service to Rome, its first destination in Europe. The progress made by the airline was threatened by an Israeli air raid during the 1967 Six-Day War when the DC-7 aircraft were destroyed. They were replaced by two Fokker F27 Friendship airliners.

In 1968, the airline joined the jet age when it introduced the Sud Aviation Caravelle, and expanded the route network to Nicosia, Benghazi, Dhahran and Doha. 1969 saw the addition of service to Munich, Istanbul and Tehran.

In 1970, Alia phased out the F27s and ordered Boeing 707 aircraft. Frankfurt and Abu Dhabi were added to the network. The 707s were delivered in 1971. In that year, service was initiated to Madrid, Copenhagen and Karachi. During the rest of the decade, Boeing 720s, Boeing 727s, and Boeing 747s were added to the fleet. A catering department was established, and duty-free shops were opened at Amman airport. Services were added to destinations including Bahrain, Dubai, Muscat, Rabat, Geneva, Amsterdam, Baghdad, Bangkok, Vienna, Damascus, New York City, Houston, and Ras al-Khaimah. In 1979, Alia became a founding member of the Arab Airlines Technical Consortium (AATC).

In the 1980s, Tunis and Tripoli joined the route map, and Alia's IBM computer center was inaugurated. Lockheed L-1011 Tristars, Airbus A310s and Airbus A320s joined the fleet. In 1986, Alia changed its name to Royal Jordanian, when princess Alia was nearing her divorce. The airline's first woman pilot flew one of their aircraft during this decade. Service was added to Belgrade, Chicago, Los Angeles, Miami, Bucharest, Singapore, Riyadh, Kuala Lumpur – in cooperation with MAS, Sana'a, Moscow. Montreal, Delhi, Calcutta and Ankara. This decade also saw the introduction of the Gabriel Automated Ticket System – (GATS).

The 1990s saw further expansion. Royal Jordanian and nine other Arab air carriers signed up for the Galileo CRS. The IMCS maintenance and engineering system was added, a new Amman city air terminal was opened at the 7th Circle of the Jordanian capital, and services to Rafah started, since then halted. The cities of Toronto, Colombo, Jakarta,  Berlin, Mumbai, Milan and Tel Aviv were added to the network. In November 1997, Royal Jordanian became a code-sharing partner with the US carrier Trans World Airlines and moved operations into the TWA Flight Center (Terminal 5) at the John F. Kennedy International Airport in New York.

2000 and beyond, and privatization 
In 2000, the U.S. Federal Aviation Administration (FAA) renewed the airline's maintenance and engineering department's license. The duty-free shop was among the services to be privatised. A holding company, RJI, wholly owned by the government, was incorporated as a public limited company in February 2001 to hold all the airlines and associated investments. The airline's name was changed on 5 February 2001 to Alia – The Royal Jordanian Airlines Company, although travellers still use the popular name of Royal Jordanian.

The flag carrier's subsidiary Royal Wings operated an Airbus A320-212 aircraft on both scheduled and charter services to destinations in Egypt, Cyprus, and Israel.

On 20 December 2006, Royal Jordanian announced that they would replace two Airbus A321s with two new units, and order four new Airbus A319s to enter service in early 2008.

In April 2007, Royal Jordanian became part of Oneworld, thus becoming the first Arab airline to join such a global alliance system. The following month, the airline announced an order for a total of 10 Boeing 787 Dreamliners, for service entry in 2010. This is the first order Royal Jordanian has placed with Boeing.

Montreal was re-added to the network on 25 May 2007, after the route was cancelled in 1997. Also during May, Royal Jordanian was the sponsor of the World Economic Forum, which was held at the Dead Sea, Jordan.

On 11 July 2007, Royal Jordanian celebrated thirty years of non-stop service between Amman and New York City, making it the longest-serving Arab airline to this gateway to the U.S. RJ won the "Airline Strategy Award" in the technology category at the sixth annual Airline Strategy Awards on 16 July 2007. On 23 July, RJ saw the introduction of cargo flights, Damascus being the first destination served from Amman, using a Boeing 737.

Royal Jordanian made its first flight to Budapest, on 28 July, using an Embraer 195. In October, RJ announced the switch of two Embraer 195 jets of its original order to two Embraer 175 jets. Royal Jordanian opened a new lounge at King Hussein International Airport in Aqaba.

RJ will be the first Middle East airline to provide its passengers with OnAir's in-flight Internet and mobile phone services, including e-mail, SMS and voice calls. Royal Jordanian has upgraded its three Airbus A310s at a cost of over 10 million Jordanian dinars (JOD).

Royal Jordanian was privatized at the end of 2007, resulting in 71% of its assets being sold. The market capitalization of the company stands at 260 million JOD, and share-trading commenced on 17 December 2007.

On 24 December 2007, Royal Jordanian confirmed Baku as one of its new destinations for 2008, using an Embraer 195 twice weekly from Amman. In early 2008, however, RJ officials decided against the new route, citing that high fuel prices and a new market were a risk too large to take at that time. Royal Jordanian plans to operate the Amman-Baku route in late 2009 or early 2010. On 22 January 2008, RJ launched flights to Hong Kong via Bangkok, with three flights/week during winter, and five flights/week during summer, making it the airline's first route to China.

The Airbus A319 entered service on 13 March 2008, making RJ the first Middle East airline to operate three aircraft of the Airbus A320 family. On 17 August 2008, Royal Jordanian opened a new route to Kyiv, using Embraer 195 jets for this twice-weekly service. On 24 August 2008, Royal Jordanian opened its new lounge at Queen Alia International Airport Amman, replacing the "Petra" and "Jerash" lounges. The new lounge is located on the second floor of the South Terminal and is the second-largest airport lounge in the Middle East, being able to handle over 340 passengers.

The airline recorded an 18% increase in passenger numbers in July 2008. With the airline transporting 278,000 passengers, the seat factor grew by 5% in that month to reach 81%. As part of Royal Jordanian's commitment to its airline alliance Oneworld, an announcement was made at the alliance's 10th birthday celebrations on 3 February 2009 that RJ would paint its new A319 (due for delivery in late March) in a scheme that would be based around the Oneworld name and logo. This is the first special colour scheme Royal Jordanian will have used.

Royal Jordanian resumed service to Brussels on 1 April 2009, six years after the route was discontinued by the airline, flying twice weekly from Amman with the airline planning to add a further two flights per week later in 2009.

On 28 March 2010, Royal Jordanian inaugurated regular direct flights to Madinah Munawwarah, Saudi Arabia, with four weekly flights. On the 23 March, Royal Jordanian confirmed that it had ordered two A330-200s and one Embraer 175. Royal Jordanian recommenced operations to Malaysia's capital Kuala Lumpur on June 2, 2010, after it had suspended this route in 2004. Aircraft used on this route is the new Airbus A330-200 and later switched to Boeing 787 Dreamliner.

In May 2011, Royal Jordanian announced that they will retire the Airbus A310 aircraft in December 2011, and January 2012. Royal Jordanian uses an Airbus A330 and an Airbus A321 for non-stop flights to London (Heathrow Terminal 3).

In June 2014, Royal Jordanian announced that it had suspended services to Mosul in northern Iraq due to the capture of the airport by the Islamic State.

The first of Royal Jordanian's Boeing 787 Dreamliner aircraft (267-seat, two-class configuration) entered service in September 2014, initially linking Amman with Jeddah, Saudi Arabia. The 787 Dreamliner is Royal Jordanian's first Boeing aircraft since the 707s and 747s, and replaced the Airbus A340-200s which had reached the end of their lives. The Dreamliners have replaced the Airbus A330-200s as leases on those aircraft have expired. The Dreamliners are generally used on Royal Jordanian's Far East destinations, to London and North America.

In May 2017, Royal Jordanian announced the appointment of Stefan Pichler, the ex CEO of Air Berlin, Fiji Airways, Jazeera Airways, Virgin Australia and Thomas Cook as the new president and CEO.
Pichler developed a turnaround plan which helped moving Royal Jordanian back into profitability by the end of 2017. In this context, the airline cancelled the order of the 8th Dreamliner and also withdrew the A330F from its Cargo fleet for similar reasons. The CEO also stated that the strategy of Royal Jordanian would lead to a single type narrow-body fleet, not mentioning whether it will be Airbus, Boeing, Bombardier, or Embraer. In September 2020, Pichler resigned from his duties which were taken over by Chairman Saeed Samih Darwazah.

Corporate affairs

Head office 

, Haddadinco Engineering Company for Contracting is building the new Royal Jordanian head office in Amman. The building was designed by Niels Torp. The new building was completed in late 2011, and RJ employees began work in the building on January 3, 2012. In the 1960s, Alia's head office was in the Mango Building in Amman.

Employment 
Royal Jordanian has invested heavily in its crew training facility at its headquarters in Amman. , Royal Jordanian employed 4,394 people, according to the most recent annual report.

Rivalry 
Royal Jordanian began to put into place a new strategy at the end of 2002 which saw the airline concentrate on its neighboring nations, with increased frequencies. In a plan to establish itself as the Middle East's "regional airline" it began to add smaller routes such as Alexandria in Egypt to Aleppo in Syria which the bigger airlines, such as Emirates, would not undertake with the larger aircraft compared to Royal Jordanian's regional jets. As of the end of 2008, the plan had proven successful for the airline, with its main rivals being Middle East Airlines and Egypt Air.

Since 2008, Royal Jordanian has faced increased competition within the Middle East. The arrival of many new low-cost airlines such as Air Arabia, Jazeera Airways, and flydubai have caused problems for the Jordanian airline. With the arrival of these new airlines, Royal Jordanian has focused upon improving its onboard and ground services in order to retain market share.

Business figures 
The following information can be found in the 2009, 2013, 2015, 2016, 2017 and 2018 Royal Jordanian Annual Reports.

Destinations

Codeshare agreements 
Royal Jordanian codeshares with the following airlines:

 American Airlines
 British Airways
 Etihad Airways
 Gulf Air
 ITA Airways
 Malaysia Airlines
 Oman Air
 Qatar Airways
 Royal Air Maroc
 TAROM
 Turkish Airlines

Fleet

Current fleet 

, the Royal Jordanian fleet consists of the following aircraft:

Former fleet 
Royal Jordanian previously operated the following aircraft types:

Livery 

From 1963 to 1986, the original livery of Royal Jordanian Airlines consisted of a white fuselage with both red and gold cheatlines.

In December 1986, the airline changed its name from Alia Royal Jordanian Airlines to simply Royal Jordanian Airlines, which coincided the arrival of Airbus A310 and Airbus A320 airliners. The new livery consisted of a charcoal grey fuselage with the same red and gold cheatlines, similar to the earlier version. The tail consists of a golden crown with a red tip on the charcoal grey coloured aircraft tail.

Special color schemes 

Until 2009, Royal Jordanian had never had an aircraft painted in a special colour scheme. It announced at the 10th birthday celebrations in February 2009 of the airline alliance Oneworld that it would paint its new A319 due for delivery in late March in a special scheme, which would be based around the Oneworld name and logo. The aircraft, registration JY-AYP, has its fuselage painted white, with the tailfin and engines in normal Royal Jordanian colours. "A member of Oneworld" in prominent lettering is located at the front of the aircraft, with the usual title "Royal Jordanian" further back.

In October 2021, Royal Jordanian unveiled "Discover Petra" special livery on one of its Boeing 787 Dreamliners, registered JY-BAH.

A month later, in November 2021, the airline revealed an Airbus A321, JY-AYV, in its retro "Alia" livery. The aircraft's first flight in the new paint scheme was to London Heathrow.

Services

Catering 
Food and drinks served on flights leaving Amman are provided by Dnata. Hot meals will be served on a flight of at least three hours in length. If the flight is shorter than one hour, the cabin crew will provide snacks and drinks throughout, or before, the flight. These flights include those to Tel Aviv, Cairo, Baghdad, Beirut and Aqaba from Amman.

In-flight entertainment 
Royal Jordanian's onboard entertainment system is called "Sky Cinema".
 In Economy Class on board the Airbus and Boeing aircraft all passengers are supplied with personal televisions (PTV), the system is audio- and video-on-demand system (AVOD). The system provides passengers with a selection of movies, television shows, audio and games.
 In Crown Class, passengers are provided with AVOD which includes a large library of movies, television shows, audio and games on board the Airbus and Boeing aircraft. Portable entertainment devices (IMS) are only available for Crown Class passengers flying on Embraer aircraft. The IMS service is provided on all international flights. The IMS library contains movies, short subjects, an audio library and games.

Interactive games are available in all classes on all flights, as well as news provided by CNN on all flights. On very short flights (from Amman to Tel Aviv, Beirut or Damascus), the AVOD system is turned on but there is only the selection of games, CNN News, the "Flight Show", and the comedy channel. This is due to the flights being less than 45 minutes hence movies/shows would not be complete upon arrival.

Seating 
Crown Class seats on Boeing 787s are fully flat beds. Seat pitch is 83 inches on the Dreamliners and 46 inches on the short and medium haul aircraft. In Economy Class, Royal Jordanian offers 32-inch seat pitch on board its Embraer aircraft, whilst it offers 34-inch seat pitch on board its Airbus aircraft. All Royal Jordanian Economy class seats also offer a foot-rest.

Crown Class lounges 
Crown Class passengers can use lounges across the world including all Oneworld member airline lounges.  Royal Jordanian operates two lounges: one in Amman, at Queen Alia International Airport, and one at Aqaba, at King Hussein International Airport. In August 2008, Royal Jordanian opened its new lounge, which can handle over 340 passengers. It is located in the South Terminal on the second floor and replaces the previous Jerash and Petra lounges in the airport.

Frequent-flyer program 
Royal Club is Royal Jordanian's frequent flyer program. Passengers are awarded miles based on the type, class of flight and destination. Royal Club members can also get miles by traveling on other Oneworld airlines. Card holders of Royal Jordanian's Royal Plus with either Silver, Gold or Platinum can use Oneworld airport services across the world while Gold and Platinum also have lounge access.

Accidents and incidents 
Royal Jordanian has experienced 13 aviation occurrences and six hijackings throughout its history, four of them fatal. The airline's two worst accidents, both involving chartered Boeing 707s, happened in Nigeria in 1973 and Morocco in 1975, and to date are both the deadliest accidents in those countries and the deadliest worldwide involving the 707.
On April 10, 1965, all 54 passengers and crew aboard an ALIA Handley Page HPR-7 Herald 207 died after their plane crashed into a mountain near Damascus, Syria as a result of a structural failure of the fuselage in flight.
On January 22, 1973, 176 people were killed when an ALIA Boeing 707 was landing at Kano, Nigeria.
On August 3, 1975, all 188 people on board were killed when an ALIA Boeing 707 struck a mountain ridge while making its approach for a landing in Morocco.
On March 14, 1979, 45 of the 64 persons aboard an ALIA Boeing 727 were killed as a result of a windshear on landing at the Doha International Airport in Qatar.
On June 11, 1985, Fawaz Younis and four Amal Movement men hijacked Flight 402, a Boeing 727, forcing the plane to and from Beirut and Jordan. 13 hours later, after releasing the passengers, the hijackers blew up the plane.

Since the name of the carrier was changed to Royal Jordanian Airlines in 1986, the only fatal incident was when a hijacker, seeking political asylum, was killed by the on-board security agent on 5 July 2000, on board a Royal Jordanian Airbus A320 flying from Amman to Damascus.

References

External links 

 (Royal Jordanian)
 (Royal Jordanian Cargo)

 
Airlines of Jordan
Arab Air Carriers Organization members
Airlines established in 1963
Jordan
Companies based in Amman
Jordanian brands
1963 establishments in Jordan